Campofiorito (Sicilian: Campuciurutu) is a comune (municipality) in the Metropolitan City of Palermo in the Italian region Sicily, located about  south of Palermo.

Campofiorito borders the following municipalities: Bisacquino, Contessa Entellina, Corleone.

Twin towns — sister cities
Campofiorito is twinned with:

  Aci Catena, Italy
  Catenanuova, Italy

References

External links
 Official website 

Municipalities of the Metropolitan City of Palermo